Thump may refer to:
 Thump (Vice), a music and culture channel of the magazine Vice
 Icky Thump, 2007 album by US alternative rock band The White Stripes
 "Icky Thump" (song), by American alternative rock band The White Stripes
 Thump Records, US record label

Places
 Thumptown, Pennsylvania, United States (also known as 'Trumptown')

See also
 Thumper (disambiguation)